Bolivia at the 1968 Summer Olympics in Mexico City, Mexico was the third appearance of the nation at the sixteenth edition of the Olympic Summer Games. Bolivia sent to the 1968 Summer Olympics its third national team under the auspices of the Bolivian Olympic Committee ( - COB) four athletes (all men) competed in three events in three sports.

Canoeing

Men's K-1 1000m:
Fernando Inchauste - DNF

Equestrian

Roberto Nielsen-Reyes

Shooting

Two male shooters represented Bolivia in 1968.

Trap
 Carlos Asbun
 Ricardo Roberts

References

External links
Official Olympic Reports

Nations at the 1968 Summer Olympics
1968
Olympics